Events from the year 1951 in South Korea.

Incumbents
President: Rhee Syng-man 
Vice President: Yi Si-yeong (until 9 May), Kim Seong-su (starting 17 May)
Prime Minister: Chang Myon

Events
January 4th:January–Fourth Retreat

February 9th:Geochang massacre

Births

Bae Yong-kyun
Chung Mong-joon:Korean businessman and politician
Kim Ja-ok:Korean actress

Deaths
Soh Jaipil: Korean-American political activist and physician who was a noted champion of the Korean independence movement
Kim Dong-in:Korean novelist

See also
List of South Korean films of 1951
Years in Japan
Years in North Korea

References

 
South Korea
Years of the 20th century in South Korea
1950s in South Korea
South Korea